Win Maung (born 1 February 1946) is a Burmese boxer, who competed in the 1972 Summer Olympics in Munich. Competing in the Bantamweight category, he lost to Orlando Martínez of Cuba in the second round.

References

Boxers at the 1972 Summer Olympics
Living people
Burmese male boxers
Olympic boxers of Myanmar
Asian Games medalists in boxing
Boxers at the 1966 Asian Games
Boxers at the 1970 Asian Games
Medalists at the 1966 Asian Games
Medalists at the 1970 Asian Games
Asian Games bronze medalists for Myanmar
Asian Games silver medalists for Myanmar
1946 births
Bantamweight boxers